Naomi Takemoto-Chock is a Hawaiian psychologist, known for her contributions to the Big five personality traits.

Her article "Factors" has been* widely cited in the literature.

Bibliography

References 

People from Hawaii
Living people
American women psychologists
21st-century American psychologists
Year of birth missing (living people)
21st-century American women
Place of birth missing (living people)